Jutra is a Canadian short documentary film, directed by Marie-Josée Saint-Pierre and released in 2014. Blending live action with animation, the film is a portrait of influential Quebec filmmaker Claude Jutra, structured as an interview in which Jutra is both the questioner and the interview guest.

The film premiered at the Saguenay International Short Film Festival in March 2014. It was subsequently screened at the 2014 Cannes Film Festival in the Director's Fortnight stream.

The film won the Canadian Screen Award for Best Short Documentary Film at the 3rd Canadian Screen Awards, and the Prix Jutra for Best Animated Short Film at the 17th Jutra Awards.

References

External links

Jutra at the National Film Board of Canada

2014 films
Canadian short documentary films
Best Short Documentary Film Genie and Canadian Screen Award winners
Canadian animated short films
Canadian animated documentary films
National Film Board of Canada documentaries
National Film Board of Canada animated short films
French-language Canadian films
2010s Canadian films
Best Animated Short Film Jutra and Iris Award winners
2014 short documentary films